Jorge Calderón, originally from San Juan, Puerto Rico, is an American multi-instrumentalist, songwriter and record producer best known for his collaborations with Warren Zevon and Buckingham Nicks. He began working with Buckingham Nicks in 1972 as a percussionist. He toured with the band until they disbanded in 1975. He later worked with Fleetwood Mac, recording and writing a song, "Kiss and Run". The song was released on the 2004 remastered version of Tusk.  He holds the unique distinction of having been credited on all of Warren Zevon's post-1976 albums with the exception of My Ride's Here.  Additionally, he co-produced Zevon's final album The Wind, on which he also co-wrote many of the tracks, as well as the Zevon tribute album Enjoy Every Sandwich: Songs of Warren Zevon.  On The Wind, he plays bass, acoustic guitar, various percussion, electric guitar, as well as providing background vocals.

Calderón released one album featuring his own songs on Warner Bros. Records in 1975 titled City Music.

In September 2018, Calderón released a new album Blue Rhythm Highway on Inside Recordings featuring Ry Cooder, David Lindley, Jim Keltner and Van Dyke Parks, among others. Tracks include "Blue City", "Down by the Breadfruit Trees", "Sky Blue Chevrolet" and "Deeper Blue".

References

Puerto Rican multi-instrumentalists
musicians from San Juan, Puerto Rico
Puerto Rican record producers
Living people
20th-century Puerto Rican musicians
21st-century Puerto Rican musicians
Year of birth missing (living people)